Xtreme is the bachata group Xtreme's first album under a recognized label, SGZ Entertainment. The album contains the singles, "Te Extraño" and "Honey I Do". The album was later re-issued under the Univision Music Group label after their acquisition of SGZ International. Only Steve Styles and Danny D were on the cover of the re-issued edition because Elvis Rosario had left the group.

Track listing

Charts

References

2005 albums
2005 debut albums
Xtreme (group) albums